Desmond "Des" Frederick Palmer (born 23 September 1931) is a retired Welsh male international footballer forward. He was part of the Wales national football team, playing 3 matches and scoring 3 goals. He played his first match on 26  May 1957 against Czechoslovakia  and his last match on 19  October 1957 against England. He scored a hat-trick during the 1958 FIFA World Cup qualification of the match against East Germany on 25 September 1957. On club level he played for Swansea City A.F.C. between 1952 and 1959. He then moved to Liverpool, but didn't play a match for their senior team. He had a successful stint with Johannesburg Ramblers before playing a final season (1961–62) in England with Derby County F.C. during which he made 18 appearances and scored 6 goals.

After this, Palmer moved to Australia and played two seasons with Port Melbourne Slavia in the Victorian State League. He guided his team to victory in the 1963 Australia Cup, scoring a hat-trick in their 3–2 win in the Final Replay against Polonia Melbourne.

See also
 List of Wales international footballers (alphabetical)
 List of Wales national football team hat-tricks

References

External links
 

1931 births
Welsh footballers
Wales international footballers
Place of birth missing
Year of death missing
Association football forwards
Footballers from Swansea